Pahadi Shareef is a village located in the suburbs of Hyderabad, India. This village is famous for the Dargah of Syedna Baba Sharfuddin.

References 

3.Hazrat Baba sharfuddin soharwardi Rh (pahadi shareef Dargha)
by www.auliadeccan.com

External links
http://articles.timesofindia.indiatimes.com/2012-04-05/hyderabad/31293315_1_wakf-land-wakf-properties-wakf-board

Villages in Ranga Reddy district